The following is a list of computer and video game musicians, those who have worked in the video game industry to produce video game soundtracks or otherwise contribute musically. A broader list of major figures in the video game industry is also available.

For a full article, see video game music. The list is sorted in alphabetical order by last name.



A
Rod Abernethy – The Hobbit, Star Trek: Legacy, King Arthur, Rise of the Kasai, Blazing Angels, Marvel Universe, The Gauntlet, The Sims Bustin' Out
Masamichi Amano – Quest 64
Yoshino Aoki – Mega Man X3 (Capcom Sound Team), Breath of Fire III (with Akari Kaida), Breath of Fire IV, Mega Man Battle & Chase
Noriyuki Asakura – Tenchu: Stealth Assassins, Tenchu 2: Birth of the Stealth Assassins, Tenchu: Wrath of Heaven, Way of the Samurai, Way of the Samurai 2, Kamiwaza

B
Michael Bacon – VS, Duke Nukem: Land of the Babes, EverQuest II: The Shadow Odyssey
Angelo Badalamenti – Indigo Prophecy
Kelly Bailey – Half-Life, Half-Life 2, Half-Life 2: Episode One, Half-Life 2: Episode Two, Portal
Clint Bajakian – Star Wars Jedi Knight II: Jedi Outcast, Star Wars Jedi Knight: Jedi Academy, Star Wars: Knights of the Old Republic
Lorne Balfe – Call of Duty: Modern Warfare 2, Skylanders: Spyro's Adventure, Assassin's Creed: Revelations, Skylanders: Giants, Assassin's Creed III, Beyond: Two Souls
Danny Baranowsky – Super Meat Boy, Canabalt, Crypt of the Necrodancer and The Binding of Isaac
Stephen Barton – Call of Duty 4: Modern Warfare, Titanfall series, Star Wars Jedi: Fallen Order
Joe Basquez – Ultima Online
Jean Baudlot – Bio Challenge, Bad Dudes, Future Wars, Castle Warrior, Beach Volley, Snow Brothers, Operation Stealth, Ivanhoe, Cruise for a Corpse, Flashback: The Quest for Identity
Stephen Baysted – Project Cars series, Fast and Furious Crossroads, Need for Speed: Shift 2 Unleashed
Robin Beanland – Killer Instinct series, Conker's Bad Fur Day, Sea of Thieves
David Bergeaud – Ratchet and Clank series, Resistance: Fall of Man
Daniel Bernstein – Blood, Claw
Teddy Blass – Chain Shooter, Fortune's Prime
Alexander Brandon – Unreal, Unreal Tournament, Deus Ex, Gauntlet: Seven Sorrows, Alpha Protocol, Unreal 2, Deus Ex: Invisible War, Battlestar Galactica, Neverwinter Nights 2: Mask of the Betrayer, Bejeweled 3 (with Peter Hajba)
Allister Brimble – Alien Breed, Superfrog, RollerCoaster Tycoon, Driver, Driver 2, RollerCoaster Tycoon 2
Russell Brower – World of Warcraft: The Burning Crusade, World of Warcraft: Wrath of the Lich King, World of Warcraft: Cataclysm, Diablo III, Starcraft 2
Bill Brown – Command and Conquer: Generals, Command & Conquer: Generals Zero Hour, Return to Castle Wolfenstein, Tom Clancy's Ghost Recon, Tom Clancy's Ghost Recon: Island Thunder, Tom Clancy's Ghost Recon: Jungle Storm, Tom Clancy's Rainbow Six, Tom Clancy's Rainbow Six: Rogue Spear, Tom Clancy's Rainbow Six: Black Thorn, Tom Clancy's Rainbow Six 3: Raven Shield, Tom Clancy's Rainbow Six: Lockdown, Wolfenstein: Enemy Territory
David Buckley — Shrek Forever After (video game), additional music for Metal Gear Solid 4: Guns of the Patriots, Batman: Arkham Knight and Batman: Arkham VR with Nick Arundel

C
Sean Callery – James Bond 007: Everything or Nothing, 24: The Game
Pedro Macedo Camacho – Star Citizen, Wolfenstein II: The New Colossus, Audiosurf (Independent Games Festival 2008 Excellence in Audio Award Winner), Fury (Auran, Gamecock, Codemasters), A Vampyre Story (Autumn Moon Entertainment)
Marc Canham — Stuntman (video game), Taz: Wanted, Driver 3 , Act of War: Direct Action , 24: The Game, Reservoir Dogs (video game), Driver: Parallel Lines, Driver 76 , Far Cry 2, Killzone 2 , Split/Second, Chime, Driver: San Francisco, The Secret World, Infamous First Light, Infamous Second Son
Stuart Chatwood – Road Rash 3D, NHL 2002, Prince of Persia: The Sands of Time, Prince of Persia: Warrior Within, Prince of Persia: The Two Thrones, Battles of Prince of Persia, Prince of Persia: Revelations, Prince of Persia: Rival Swords
Jun Chikuma – Faxanadu, Adventure Island, Bomberman series
Jamie Christopherson – Lineage II: The Chaotic Chronicle, Lost Planet. Lord of the Rings: The Battle For Middle-Earth, Metal Gear Rising: Revengeance
Elia Cmíral – The Last Express
Combichrist – DmC: Devil May Cry
 Gareth Coker – Ori and the Blind Forest, Ori and the Will of the Wisps, Ark: Survival Evolved, Immortals Fenyx Rising, Halo Infinite
Peter Connelly – Three games from the Tomb Raider series
Stewart Copeland – Urban Strike, Spyro the Dragon series (Spyro the Dragon to Spyro: Enter the Dragonfly), Alone in the Dark: The New Nightmare
Normand Corbeil – Fahrenheit, Heavy Rain, Beyond: Two Souls
Jonathan Coulton – Portal, Portal 2, Left 4 Dead 2
Jessica Curry - Dear Esther, Everybody's Gone to the Rapturee

D
Ben Daglish
Joris de Man – Killzone series, Horizon Zero Dawn
Charles Deenen – M.C. Kids, The Lost Vikings (with Allister Brimble), Descent II (mixing)
Rom Di Prisco – Fortnite, Xtreme Sports Arcade, Rebel Moon Rising, Need for Speed II, Need for Speed III: Hot Pursuit, World Cup 98, Sled Storm, Carnivores 2, Need for Speed: High Stakes, NHL 2000, FIFA 2000, 007 Racing, Need for Speed: Porsche Unleashed, Rune, Blair Witch Volume 2: The Legend of Coffin Rock, Rune: Viking Warlord, NHL 2001, Rune: Halls of Valhalla, SSX Tricky, Need for Speed: Hot Pursuit 2, NHL 2002, SpyHunter 2, Dead Man's Hand, Full Auto, Full Auto 2: Battlelines, Unreal Tournament 3, SSX, Guacamelee! and Guacamelee! 2
 Sascha Dikiciyan – Quake II, The Long Dark, Mass Effect 3, Quake 3 Arena, James Bond Tomorrow never dies
 Ramin Djawadi 
James Dooley – Epic Mickey
Christopher Drake – Batman: Arkham Origins, Injustice: Gods Among Us, Injustice 2
Howard Drossin – Comix Zone, Sonic Spinball
Dynamedion - Hitman: Absolution, Halo Legends, Call of Duty 4, Mortal Kombat X

E
Randy Edelman
Greg Edmonson – Uncharted series
Takahito Eguchi – The Bouncer, Final Fantasy X-2
Jared Emerson-Johnson – Sam & Max series, Wallace and Gromit's Grand Adventures, Back to the Future: The Game, Jurassic Park: The Game, The Walking Dead (video game)
Eminence Symphony Orchestra – Odin Sphere, Deltora Quest: The Seven Jewels, Valkyria Chronicles, Diablo III, Soulcalibur IV
Jon Everist - BattleTech (video game), Overwatch 2, Shadowrun: Hong Kong, The Solitaire Conspiracy

F
Eveline Fischer (now Eveline Novakovic) – Donkey Kong Country (with Robin Beanland and David Wise), Donkey Kong Country 3: Dixie Kong's Double Trouble! (with David Wise)
Ron Fish – Batman: Arkham City, God of War
The Flight – Alien: Isolation, Horizon: Zero Dawn
Tim Follin – Ghouls and Ghosts (Amiga and C64 versions), Ecco the Dolphin: Defender of the Future (Dreamcast), and various assorted tracks for 8- and 16-bit videogames.
Troels Brun Folmann –  Tomb Raider: Legend and Tomb Raider: Anniversary
Dan Forden – Mortal Kombat series
Toby Fox – Undertale, Hiveswap, Deltarune, Super Smash Bros. Ultimate, Little Town Hero, Pokémon Sword and Shield
Hiroshi Fujioka – Growlanser II, Growlanser III, Langrisser III
Yasuhiko Fukuda – sometimes credited as Hirohiko Fukuda, known for Emerald Dragon (SNES)
Kenichiro Fukui - Einhänder
Brad Fuller (composer) – Tengen Tetris, Marble Madness, Gauntlet II, S.T.U.N. Runner, RoadBlasters, Xybots, Blasteroids,  Klax (video game), Steel Talons, Off the Wall (video game), Toobin', Rampart (video game), APB (1987 video game), 720°, Peter Pack Rat, T-Mek, Rolling Thunder (video game),  Vindicators, Space Lords, Firefox (video game), Road Runner (video game), Explore Technologies
Takeshi Furukawa – The Last Guardian

G

Martin Galway –  Commodore 64 sound programmer and composer for Ocean Software and Imagine Software (after Ocean bought the company).
Genki Rockets – Lumines II, Child of Eden
Raphaël Gesqua – Flashback: The Quest For Identity, Mr. Nutz, Moto Racer
Michael Giacchino – Medal of Honor series (1999–2003, 2007), Call of Duty series (2003-2004), Secret Weapons Over Normandy, BLACK
Mick Gordon – Need for Speed: Shift, Shift 2 Unleashed, Killer Instinct, Wolfenstein: The New Order, Doom, Doom Eternal
Simon Gosling – Croc 2
Jason Graves – Command and Conquer 4, Dead Space series, City of Heroes, Silent Hunter series, Tomb Raider (2013 video game), Until Dawn
Fred Gray – Shadowfire, Mutants, Madballs, Enigma Force, Black Lamp, Eco, Stargoose, Victory Road
Gustaf Grefberg – Enclave (video game), The Chronicles of Riddick: Escape from Butcher Bay
Harry Gregson-Williams – Metal Gear Solid 2: Sons of Liberty, Metal Gear Solid 3: Snake Eater, Metal Gear Solid 4: Guns of the Patriots
Mark Griskey – Harry Potter and the Goblet of Fire, Star Wars: Knights of the Old Republic 2: The Sith Lords, Star Wars Episode 3: Revenge of the Sith, Rayman Raving Rabbids, Rayman Raving Rabbids 2

H
 Gordy Haab  – Star Wars: The Old Republic, Star Wars Battlefront series, Halo Wars 2
Peter Hajba – Bejeweled series
Masashi Hamauzu – SaGa Frontier 2, Tobal No. 1, Final Fantasy X (with Nobuo Uematsu and Junya Nakano), Final Fantasy XIII, Final Fantasy XIII-2, Final Fantasy VII Remake
Kentarō Haneda – Wizardry 1, 2, and 3; Wizardry V: Heart of the Maelstrom
James Hannigan – Harry Potter and the Deathly Hallows, Command and Conquer 4: Tiberian Twilight, The Lord of the Rings: Aragorn's Quest, Command and Conquer: Red Alert 3, Cloudy With a Chance of Meatballs, Primeval (ITV), Harry Potter and the Half-Blood Prince, Red Alert 3 Uprising, Harry Potter and the Order of the Phoenix, Republic: The Revolution, Freelancer, Art Academy, Sim Theme Park, Mr. Bean, Grand Prix 4, Reign of Fire, Jetix, Evil Genius, Catwoman, Warhammer: Dark Omen, FIFA Soccer Manager, Conquest: Frontier Wars, Sim Coaster, F1 Manager, Evil Genius 2
Jon Hare – Cannon Fodder series, Sensible Soccer series, Sensible Golf
Kurt Harland – Soul Reaver
Aki Hata (occasionally credited as AKI) – Rocket Knight Adventures (with Masanori Ohuchi, Masanori Adachi, Hiroshi Kobayashi and Michiru Yamane), Dynamite Headdy (with Norio Hanzawa and Nazo² Suzuki)
Kärtsy Hatakka – Max Payne, Max Payne 2
Christophe Héral – Beyond Good & Evil, Rayman Origins, Rayman Legends
Norihiko Hibino – Metal Gear: Ghost Babel, Zone of the Enders, Metal Gear Solid 2: Sons of Liberty, Boktai, Metal Gear Solid 3: Snake Eater
Miki Higashino – Genso Suikoden II, Genso Suikogaiden series
Susumu Hirasawa – Sword of the Berserk: Guts' Rage, BERSERK ~Hawk of the Millennium Empire Arc - Chapter of the Holy Demon War~
Joe Hisaishi - professional name of Mamoru Fujisawa, composer and musical director known for Ni no Kuni
Silas Hite – Skate 3, The Simpsons, The Sims 2, The Sims 2: University, The Sims 2: Open For Business, The Sims 2: Pets, The Sims 2: Castaway, The Sims 2: Bon Voyage, My Sims, My Sims: Agents, MySims Kingdom, MySims Racing, Boom Blox, Boom Blox: Bash Party, Academy of Champions, Mean Girls, Legally Blonde, Wordsworth, Frogger: Ancient Shadow (with Mutato Muzika)
Michael Hoenig – Baldur's Gate, Baldur's Gate II: Shadows of Amn
Alec Holowka – Aquaria
Shinji Hosoe – Ridge Racer series, Street Fighter EX series
Niamh Houston - Super Hexagon, Dicey Dungeons
Rob Hubbard – Many games for Atari 8-bit family, Commodore 64 including International Karate and Jet Set Willy
Chris Huelsbeck – Apidya, Great Giana Sisters, Turrican series
Michael Hunter – Grand Theft Auto: San Andreas, Grand Theft Auto IV
Andrew Hulshult - Dusk, Quake Champions, Doom Eternal: The Ancient Gods Part 1

I

Arata Iiyoshi - Kamaitachi no Yoru series (with Kojiro Nakashima), Pokémon Mystery Dungeon series, Ninjala, Bemani series
Tsuneo Imahori – Gungrave
Laura Intravia - Arkhangel: The House of the Seven Stars
Mark Isham
Daisuke Ishiwatari – Guilty Gear series
Naoki Itamura – Tail to Nose: Great Championship, Pipe Dream, Aero Fighters, Hyper V-Ball, F-1 Grand Prix series
Kenji Ito – SaGa series, Seiken Densetsu 1, Tobal No. 1, Shinyaku Seiken Densetsu
Noriyuki Iwadare – Langrisser, Lunar, Grandia, Growlancer, Phoenix Wright: Ace Attorney − Trials and Tribulations, Radiata Stories
Masaharu Iwata – Final Fantasy Tactics (with Hitoshi Sakimoto), Stella Deus: The Gate of Eternity (with Hitoshi Sakimoto), Tactics Ogre: Let Us Cling Together (with Hitoshi Sakimoto)
Hiroyuki Iwatsuki – Mitsume ga Tōru (NES), Wild Guns (with Haruo Ohashi), Mighty Morphin Power Rangers: The Fighting Edition (with Haruo Ohashi), Mighty Morphin Power Rangers: The Movie (SNES, with Haruo Ohashi), Mighty Morphin Power Rangers (SNES, with Kinuyo Yamashita and Iku Mizutani)
Takahiro Izutani – Metal Gear Solid: Portable Ops, Yakuza 2, Metal Gear Solid 4: Guns of the Patriots, Ninja Blade

J
Henry Jackman - Just Cause 3, Uncharted 4: A Thief's End
Steve Jablonsky – The Sims 3, Prince of Persia: The Forgotten Sands, Command & Conquer, Transformers, Gears of War series 
Henry Jackman – Uncharted 4: A Thief's End, Disney Infinity 2.0
Lee Jackson – Rise of the Triad, Duke Nukem 3D, Shadow Warrior, Stargunner
Richard Jacques – Sonic R, Metropolis Street Racer, Headhunter, Sonic Chronicles: The Dark Brotherhood
JAM Project – Super Robot Wars series
Richard Joseph – Sensible Software, Bitmap Brothers, many others from 1986 to 2006

K

Akari Kaida – Breath of Fire III, Mega Man & Bass, Mega Man Battle Network, Ōkami
Yuki Kajiura – Xenosaga Episode II: Jenseits von Gut und Böse, Xenosaga Episode III: Also sprach Zarathustra
Yoko Kanno – Genghis Khan, Nobunaga's Ambition series, Uncharted Waters series, Macross Ace Frontier, Macross Ultimate Frontier, Macross Triangle Frontier
Jake Kaufman – Shantae, M&M's Minis Madness, Legend of Kay,  TMNT (Nintendo DS), Contra 4
Kenji Kawai – Sansara Naga (series), Deep Fear, Folklore
Motohiro Kawashima - Batman Returns (Sega 8-bit versions), Streets of Rage series
Hiroki Kikuta – Secret of Mana, Seiken Densetsu 3, Soukaigi, Koudelka
Grant Kirkhope – Banjo-Kazooie, Donkey Kong 64, Banjo-Tooie, GoldenEye 007, Perfect Dark, Blast Corps
Frank Klepacki – All of Westwood Studios' games while the developer was independent, including the popular Command & Conquer series.
Chris Kline – Bionic Commando (2009), Pinball Hall of Fame: The Gottlieb Collection, Pinball Hall of Fame: The Williams Collection
Mark Knight - Duke Nukem: Total Meltdown, Dungeon Keeper 2, F1 2015/2016, Populous: The Beginning
Geoff Knorr - Civilization IV, Civilization V, Elemental: Fallen Enchantress, Civilization: Beyond Earth, Civilization VI
Saori Kobayashi – Panzer Dragoon series, Shadowgate 64: Trials of the Four Towers
Konami Kukeiha Club (KONAMI's sound team)
Koji Kondo – Super Mario Bros. series, The Legend of Zelda series, Star Fox series, Yume KouJou Doki Doki Panic, Shin Onigashima, The Mysterious Murasame Castle, Super Smash Bros. Brawl (with many others)
Yuzo Koshiro – Castlevania: Portrait of Ruin (with Michiru Yamane), ActRaiser, ActRaiser 2, Ys series, Streets of Rage series, Revenge of Shinobi, Super Adventure Island,  Etrian Odyssey series
Taro Kudo – Axelay, Super Castlevania IV (with Masanori Adachi)
Kukeiha Club – see KONAMI KuKeiHa CLUB
Jesper Kyd – Hitman series, Freedom Fighters, MDK2, Adventures of Batman & Robin, Assassin's Creed, Borderlands, Borderlands 2

L
Michael Land – Monkey Island series, Star Wars games, The Dig
Tim Larkin – realMyst, Uru: Ages Beyond Myst, Pariah (video game), Myst V: End of Ages
Jean-Marc Lederman – Atlantis, Atlantis Sky Patrol, Fairies, Mystic Inn, Titanic Hidden Expedition, Snow Racer 1998, Solar Crusade, Turbogems, Fever Frenzy, SocioTown, Force of Arms
Barry Leitch – Gauntlet Dark Legacy, Rush 2, Rush 2049, Spider, Privateer Righteous Fire, TFX, Lotus 2, Utopia, Top Gear, Pixter, Supercars 2
Christopher Lennertz – Medal of Honor series (2003–2005),  James Bond 007: From Russia with Love, The Sims 3: Pets, Mass Effect 3, Scalebound
 Paul Leonard-Morgan – Battlefield Hardline, Warhammer 40,000: Dawn of War III, Cyberpunk 2077
Daniel Licht – Silent Hill: Downpour, Dishonored series
Russell Lieblich – Early Intellivision games
Richard Ludlow - Hexany Audio
Rob Lord – Aladdin
Alph Lyla (CAPCOM's sound team)

M
Naoki Maeda – Bemani series
Jun Maeda – Moon, Kanon, Air, Clannad, Tomoyo After: It's a Wonderful Life, Little Busters!, Rewrite
Josh Mancell – Crash Bandicoot (first four games), Interstate '82 (with Mark Mothersbaugh), Jak and Daxter Trilogy, The Condemned, The Megalex, Johnny Mnemonic
Mark Mancina
Christopher Mann – Independence War Deluxe Edition and Independence War 2: Edge of Chaos
Kevin Manthei – Kung Fu Panda, Marvel Universe Online, Upshift Strikeracer, Xiaolin Showdown, Ultimate Spider-Man, Kill Switch, Twisted Metal Black, Civilization II
Jerry Martin – SimCity 4: Rush Hour
Junichi Masuda – Pokémon video game series, Pulseman, Mario & Wario
Noriko Matsueda – Bahamut Lagoon, Chrono Trigger, Tobal No. 1, The Bouncer, Final Fantasy X-2
Michael McCann – Splinter Cell: Double Agent, Deus Ex: Human Revolution, Deus Ex: Mankind Divided, XCOM: Enemy Unknown, XCOM 2
Peter McConnell – Grim Fandango, Psychonauts
Bear McCreary - God of War, SOCOM 4: U.S. Navy SEALs, Dark Void
Nathan McCree – Tomb Raider, Tomb Raider 2 and Tomb Raider 3
Shoji Meguro – Digital Devil Saga series, Shin Megami Tensei: Persona series
Robyn Miller – Myst, Riven, Obduction (video game)
Toru Minegishi – The Legend of Zelda: Majora's Mask, The Legend of Zelda: The Wind Waker (with Koji Kondo, Kenta Nagata and Hajime Wakai), Splatoon series
Yasunori Mitsuda – Chrono Trigger, Mario Party, Xenogears, Xenosaga, Chrono Cross, Front Mission: Gun Hazard (with Nobuo Uematsu, Junya Nakano, and Masashi Hamauzu), Radical Dreamers,  Legaia 2: Duel Saga, Shadow Hearts
Yuu Miyake – Tekken series, Katamari Damacy
Hiroshi Miyazaki (sometimes referred to as Miyashiro Sugito or MIYA) – Captain Tsubasa 5: Hasha no Shogo Campione, Tecmo Super Bowl (SFC), Ninja Gaiden III: The Ancient Ship of Doom, Ninja Gaiden Trilogy, Kagero: Deception II, Deception III: Dark Delusion, Monster Rancher Hop-A-Bout
Naoshi Mizuta – Rockman & Forte, Parasite Eve 2, Final Fantasy XI
Jonathan Morali - Life Is Strange series
Mike Morasky – Portal, Portal 2, Team Fortress 2, Left 4 Dead, Left 4 Dead 2, Counter-Strike: Global Offensive, Half-Life: Alyx
Mark Morgan – Fallout, Fallout 2, Planescape: Torment, Descent II, Wasteland series
Akihiko Mori – Wonder Project J series
 Trevor Morris – Need for Speed Carbon, Dragon Age: Inquisition
Mark Mothersbaugh – Crash Bandicoot (as a music producer), The Sims 2, Sewer Shark
Atsuhiro Motoyama – Umihara Kawase, Ace Striker, Battle Bakraid, Bloody Roar (video game), Sorcer Striker, Dimahoo, Tekken Advance, Kuru Kuru Kururin, Kururin Paradise, Fire Pro Wrestling Returns, Style Savvy
Rika Muranaka – Castlevania: Symphony of the Night, Silent Hill, Metal Gear Solid series (all ending themes)
Mutato Muzika – see Mark Mothersbaugh

N
Hideki Naganuma – Jet Set Radio, Jet Set Radio Future, Ollie King, Sonic Rush
Masato Nakamura – Sonic the Hedgehog, Sonic the Hedgehog 2
Takayuki Nakamura – Virtua Fighter, Tobal 2, Ehrgeiz
Junya Nakano – Front Mission: Gun Hazard, Dewprism (Threads of Fate in the U.S.), Tobal No. 1, Final Fantasy X
Akito Nakatsuka – Zelda II: The Adventure of Link, Ice Climber
Junichi Nakatsuru – Soul series, Ace Combat series, Super Smash Bros. for Nintendo 3DS / Wii U
Manabu Namiki – Battle Garegga, Armed Police Batrider, DoDonPachi Dai Ou Jou, Ketsui: Kizuna Jigoku Tachi, Espgaluda, Mushihimesama, Deathsmiles, Konami ReBirth series
Michiko Naruke – Wild Arms series
Tomohito Nishiura – Dark Cloud, Dark Cloud 2
Graeme Norgate – TimeSplitters, TimeSplitters 2, TimeSplitters: Future Perfect

O
Martin O'Donnell – Halo series
Hisayoshi Ogura – Zuntata sound team, Darius, Darius II (also called Sagaia), Darius Gaiden, G Darius, The Ninja Warriors, Rainbow Islands (Master System version, with Tadashi Kimijima)
Kow Otani
Tomoya Ohtani – Sonic Heroes, Sonic the Hedgehog, Sonic Unleashed, Sonic Lost World
Keiichi Okabe – Drakengard 3, Nier series, Tekken series
Shinji Orito – Dōsei, Moon, One: Kagayaku Kisetsu e, Kanon, Air, Clannad, Tomoyo After: It's a Wonderful Life, Little Busters!, Rewrite
Michiru Ōshima – Genghis Khan II: Clan of the Grey Wolf, ICO
Kenichi Ōkuma – Ring ni Kakero

P
 John Paesano – Mass Effect: Andromeda, Detroit: Become Human, Spider-Man
Winifred Phillips – Assassin's Creed Liberation, LittleBigPlanet 3, God of War, Homefront: The Revolution, Total War Battles: Kingdom, LittleBigPlanet 2, Speed Racer, LittleBigPlanet Vita, The Da Vinci Code, LittleBigPlanet Karting, Call of Champions, Shrek the Third, LittleBigPlanet 2: Toy Story (DLC), SimAnimals, LittleBigPlanet 2: Cross Controller, Charlie and the Chocolate Factory, Legend of the Guardians: The Owls of Ga'Hoole, The Maw, Fighter Within, Spore Hero
Stéphane Picq – MegaRace, Qin, KULT: The Temple of Flying Saucers, Dune, Extase, Jumping Jackson, Purple Saturn Day, Full Metal Planete, Lost Eden, KGB (computer game), Commander Blood
 Kirill Pokrovsky – Divinity series
 Robert "Bobby" Prince – Doom , Doom II , The Ultimate Doom , Wolfenstein 3D , Spear of Destiny , Commander Keen in Goodbye Galaxy! , Commander Keen in Aliens Ate My Babysitter , Duke Nukem 3D , Rise of the Triad , Axis and Allies , DemonStar , Abuse , Word Rescue , Pickle Wars , Math Rescue , Xenophage: Alien Bloodsport , Catacomb 3D
Marcin Przybyłowicz  – The Witcher series, Cyberpunk 2077
Ari Pulkkinen – Angry Birds, Angry Birds Seasons, Trine (video game), Trine 2, Dead Nation, Outland (video game), Super Stardust HD, Shadowgrounds, Shadowgrounds Survivor

R
Lena Raine – Celeste, Minecraft, Chicory: A Colorful Tale, Deltarune
Simon Ravn – Viking: Battle for Asgard, Empire: Total War, Napoleon: Total War
Mike Reagan – God of War, God of War II, God of War III, God of War: Ghost of Sparta, Darkwatch, Darksiders, Life Is Strange: Farewell, Conan, Devil's Third, Trials Evolution, Twisted Metal: Black
Trent Reznor – Quake
Kevin Riepl – Unreal Tournament 2003, Unreal Tournament 2004, Unreal Championship 2: The Liandri Conflict, The Bible Game, Gears of War, Unreal Tournament 3, Huxley, Hunted: The Demon's Forge, Aliens: Colonial Marines
Stephen Rippy – Age of Empires series, Halo Wars
Paul Romero – Heroes of Might and Magic series, EverQuest
Daniel Rosenfeld – Minecraft
Lior Rosner – Syphon Filter: Dark Mirror
Mark Rutherford – Rogue Warrior (video game) (2009) – Bethesda Softworks, Aliens vs. Predator (2010) – Sega, NeverDead – Konami, Sniper Elite V2 – Rebellion Developments and 505 Games.

S
Toshihiko Sahashi – Blue Stinger
Sakari – Independent game musicians from around the world.
Hitoshi Sakimoto – Super Hockey '94, Radiant Silvergun, Final Fantasy Tactics, Final Fantasy Tactics Advance, Final Fantasy XII, Breath of Fire V: Dragon Quarter, Tactics Ogre: Let Us Cling Together (with Masaharu Iwata)
Motoi Sakuraba – Tales Series (with Shinji Tamura), Tenshi no Uta: Shiroki Tsubasa no Inori, Star Ocean series, Golden Sun series, Hiouden Series, Valkyrie Profile, Mario Tennis and Mario Golf series, Baten Kaitos series, Mario Sports Superstars
Tom Salta – Tom Clancy's Ghost Recon Advanced Warfighter, Tom Clancy's Ghost Recon Advanced Warfighter 2, Cold Fear, Red Steel, Need For Speed Underground 2, The Fast and The Furious: Tokyo Drift, Project Gotham Racing 3, Full Auto 2: Battlelines
Michael Salvatori – Halo series, Destiny series
George 'The Fat Man' Sanger – Wing Commander, The 7th Guest, Master of Orion
Nobuyoshi Sano – Drakengard, Ghost in the Shell: Stand Alone Complex (PS2), Ridge Racer series, Tekken series
 Gustavo Santaolalla – The Last of Us series
Ryuji Sasai – Final Fantasy Mystic Quest, Bushido Blade 2, Final Fantasy Legend III (with Chihiro Fujioka), Rudora no Hihou (Rudra's Secret Treasure), Tobal No.1 (with Yasunori Mitsuda, Masashi Hamauzu, Kenji Ito, Yasuhiro Kawakami, Junya Nakano, Yoko Shimomura & Noriko Matsueda), Xak (with Tadahiro Nitta)
Tenpei Sato – Marl Kingdom series, Disgaea: Hour of Darkness, Phantom Brave
Kan Sawada
Hiroyuki Sawano – Xenoblade Chronicles X
Kazuo Sawa – Nekketsu Kouha: Kunio-Kun, River City Ransom, Super Dodge Ball
 Sarah Schachner - Assassin's Creed Origins, Assassin's Creed Valhalla, Call of Duty: Infinite Warfare, Call of Duty: Modern Warfare
Brian L. Schmidt – NARC (video game), John Madden Football and many others.
Garry Schyman – Voyeur, Destroy All Humans!, BioShock, Middle-earth: Shadow of Mordor
Andrew Sega – Unreal, Unreal Tournament, Freelancer, Crusader series
Mark Seibert – Quest for Glory series, King's Quest series
Tsuyoshi Sekito – All-Star Pro Wrestling series, Brave Fencer Musashi, Final Fantasy II (WonderSwan Color and Final Fantasy Origins versions), Chrono Trigger (PlayStation version), Romancing SaGa: Minstrel's Song, Final Fantasy VII Advent Children, Teenage Mutant Ninja Turtles III: The Manhattan Project
Jun Senoue – Sonic the Hedgehog series, Super Smash Bros. Brawl, Super Smash Bros. for Nintendo 3DS / Wii U
Alex Seropian – Marathon
Russell Shaw – Dungeon Keeper, Syndicate, Fable and Fable 2
Laura Shigihara – To The Moon, Finding Paradise, Plants vs. Zombies, Rakuen, Quintessence: The Blighted Venom and High School Story
Go Shiina – Tales, Mr. Driller, The Idolmaster, God Eater series
Yoko Shimomura – Street Fighter II, Front Mission series, Live-A-Live, Super Mario RPG (with Nobuo Uematsu and Koji Kondo), Parasite Eve, Legend of Mana, Mario & Luigi series, Kingdom Hearts series, Final Fantasy XV
Mark Snow – Syphon Filter: The Omega Strain, Syphon Filter: Dark Mirror
Masayoshi Soken – Mario Hoops 3-on-3, Mario Sports Mix, Final Fantasy XIV
Maribeth Solomon - Sunless Sea, Sunless Skies
Jeremy Soule – Secret of Evermore, Total Annihilation, Icewind Dale, Neverwinter Nights, Morrowind, Oblivion, Skyrim, Dungeon Siege, Guildwars, Star Wars: Knights of the Old Republic series, Prey (2006)
Christopher Stevens – Syphon Filter 3
 Martin Stig Andersen  – Limbo, Inside, Wolfenstein II: The New Colossus
Koichi Sugiyama – Dragon Quest series, E.V.O.: Search for Eden, Mystery Dungeon: Shiren the Wanderer, Gandara, Hanjuku Hero series, Itadaki Street 2: Neon Sign ha Bara Shoku ni, Monopoly (Japanese version), Wingman, Wingman Special, Tetris 2+BomBliss
Keiichi Suzuki – Mother, EarthBound

T
 Bobby Tahouri – Rise of the Tomb Raider, Marvel's Avengers
Masafumi Takada – killer7, God Hand, No More Heroes, Earth Defense Force, Danganronpa
Yukihide Takekawa – Soul Blazer
Tommy Tallarico – Advent Rising, Earthworm Jim series (Earthworm Jim 2 on), Spot Goes To Hollywood, MDK, Maximo: Ghosts to Glory, Wild 9
Hirokazu 'Hip' Tanaka – Balloon Fight, EarthBound, Kid Icarus, Metroid, Mother, Super Mario Land, Tetris
Kōhei Tanaka – Paladin's Quest, Lennus 2 (Paladin's Quest 2), Xardion, Alundra, Sakura Wars series
Kumi Tanioka – Final Fantasy XI, Final Fantasy Crystal Chronicles, Code Age Commanders
Mikko Tarmia – Amnesia: The Dark Descent, The Penumbra Series, Overgrowth
Tsukasa Tawada – Super Earth Defense Force, Ihatovo Monogatari, Thoroughbred Breeder (series)
Jeroen Tel – Cybernoid, Cybernoid II, Eliminator, Turbo Outrun
Soichi Terada – Ape Escape series (except Ape Escape 2)
Chance Thomas – Lord of the Rings Online, Left Behind: Eternal Forces, Marvel Ultimate Alliance, X-Men: The Official Game, The Lord of the Rings: War of the Ring, Unreal II: The Awakening
Chris Tilton – Mercenaries: Playground of Destruction, Black, Assassin's Creed Unity
Christopher Tin – Civilization IV, Civilization VI
Magome Togoshi – Air, Clannad, Planetarian: The Reverie of a Little Planet, Tomoyo After: It's a Wonderful Life, Little Busters!
Kazumi Totaka – Super Mario Land 2: 6 Golden Coins, Yoshi's Story, Animal Crossing series, Luigi's Mansion (with Shinobu Tanaka), The Legend of Zelda: Link's Awakening (with Akito Nakamura, Minako Hamano & Koji Kondo), Super Smash Bros. Brawl, Super Smash Bros. for Nintendo 3DS / Wii U
Yuka Tsujiyoko – Fire Emblem series, Paper Mario, Paper Mario: The Thousand-Year Door
Brian Tyler - Lego Universe, Call of Duty: Modern Warfare 3, Need for Speed: The Run, Far Cry 3, Army of Two: The Devil's Cartel, Assassin's Creed IV: Black Flag
Jeff Tymoschuk – James Bond: Nightfire, DeathSpank series, Penny Arcade series, Sleeping Dogs

U

Matt Uelmen – Diablo, Diablo II, StarCraft, World of Warcraft
Tatsuya Uemura – Performan, Tiger-Heli, Flying Shark, Twin Cobra, Hellfire, Zero Wing, Out Zone, Dogyuun
Nobuo Uematsu – Final Fantasy series (except Final Fantasy XIII Trilogy and Final Fantasy XV), Apple Town Monogatari, Cruise Chaser Blassty, King's Knight, DynamiTracer, Front Mission: Gun Hazard (with Yasunori Mitsuda and Junya Nakano), Ehrgeiz, Makaitoushi SaGa (Final Fantasy Legend I), SaGa 2: Hihou Densetsu (Final Fantasy Legend II) (with Kenji Ito), Rad Racer, Romancing SaGa 1 and 2 (one song in former and two songs in latter), Chrono Trigger (with Yasunori Mitsuda and Noriko Matsueda), Super Mario RPG (with Yoko Shimomura and Koji Kondo), Blue Dragon, Lost Odyssey, Super Smash Bros. Brawl (Main Theme), and The Last Story

V

Michiel van den Bos – Unreal, Age of Wonders, Unreal Tournament, Deus Ex, Overlord 
Jeff van Dyck – Audio Director of The Creative Assembly (Total War franchise), Electronic Arts sports games (e.g. Need for Speed)
Cris Velasco – Hellgate: London, God of War, Mass Effect 3, ZombiU
Neil D. Voss – Tetrisphere, The New Tetris, Racing Gears Advance and others.
Rich Vreeland – Puzzle Agent, Drawn to Life: The Next Chapter, Fez, Runner 2, Hyper Light Drifter
Chris Vrenna – American McGee's Alice, Doom 3, Quake 4

W
Jph Wacheski
Jack Wall – Splinter Cell: Pandora Tomorrow, Myst III: Exile, Myst IV: Revelation, Jade Empire, Mass Effect series
Guy Whitmore – Blood, Claw, Die Hard: Nakatomi Plaza, Shivers, No One Lives Forever
David Whittaker – many games for Atari 8-bit family, Commodore 64 and Amiga platforms, including Amaurote, BMX Simulator, Colony, Grand Prix Simulator, Panther, Speedball, Shadow of the Beast and Obliterator
Austin Wintory - Journey, flOw, Monaco: What's Yours is Mine, Tooth and Tail, Assassin's Creed Syndicate, Abzu
David Wise – All NES games by Rare, Donkey Kong Country series, Diddy Kong Racing, Jet Force Gemini, Star Fox Adventures, Wizards and Warriors series
Jezz Woodroffe - Composed music to the two Horror Soft titles Elvira II: The Jaws of Cerberus with Philip Nixon, and Waxworks.
Tim Wright – Welsh composer who goes by the name CoLD SToRAGE, known for his work on Shadow of the Beast II, Shadow of the Beast III, Agony, Lemmings, Wipeout and Colony Wars

Y

Kenji Yamamoto – Dragon Ball Z: Super Butōden 1, 2, & 3 (#1: with Kumagorou; #2: with Switch-E, Kumatarou; #3: with Amayang, Chatrasch, Switch-E), Dragon Ball Z: Super Goku Den 1 & 2, Dragon Ball Z: Ultimate Battle 22, Dragon Ball Z: The Legend, Dragon Ball: Final Bout, Dragon Ball Z: Budokai 1, 2, & 3, Dragon Ball Z: Shin Budokai 1 & 2, Dragon Ball Z: Harukanaru Goku Densetsu, Dragon Ball Z: Burst Limit, Dragon Ball Z: Infinite World.
Kenji Yamamoto – Super Metroid (with Minako Hamano), Metroid Prime series, Metroid: Zero Mission, Famicom Tantei Club Part II, Super Smash Bros. Brawl, Donkey Kong Country Returns (with Minako Hamano and Masaru Tajima)
Michiru Yamane – Twinbee (NES), Castlevania: Bloodlines, Castlevania: Symphony of the Night, Castlevania: Harmony of Dissonance (with Soshiro Hokkai), Castlevania: Aria of Sorrow (with Soshiro Hokkai and Takashi Yoshida), Castlevania: Dawn of Sorrow, Castlevania: Lament of Innocence, Castlevania: Curse of Darkness, Castlevania: Portrait of Ruin (with Yuzo Koshiro), Castlevania: The Dracula X Chronicles, Gungage (with Sōta Fujimori), Genso suikoden III (with Tadashi Yoshida and Masahiko Kimura)
Akira Yamaoka – Silent Hill series, Contra: Shattered Soldier
Kinuyo Yamashita – Castlevania, Esper Dream, Arumana no Kiseki, Stinger, Maze of Galious, Mega Man X3,  Medabot, Bass Masters Classic, Power Rangers: Lightspeed Rescue, WWF WrestleMania 2000, Buffy the Vampire Slayer, Croc 2, Monsters, Inc., WWF Road to WrestleMania, Power Rangers: Dino Thunder, Keitai Denjū Telefang
Mahito Yokota – Donkey Kong Jungle Beat, Super Mario Galaxy series, The Legend of Zelda: Skyward Sword, New Super Mario Bros. U, Super Mario Odyssey
Kenneth Young – Media Molecule, London Studio : LittleBigPlanet series, Tearaway series
Yes - Homeworld

Z
Hans Zimmer – Call of Duty: Modern Warfare 2, Crysis 2, FIFA 19
ZUN – Touhou
Zuntata (Taito's sound team)
Inon Zur – Prince of Persia series, Crysis, Baldur's Gate, Fallout 3, Fallout New Vegas, Dragon Age: Origins

See also
OverClocked ReMix

References

Video game musicians
Video game musicians
Video game musician
+Musicians